Dublin University Fencing Club (DUFC) is the fencing club of the University of Dublin, Trinity College, located in Dublin, Ireland. The club caters for foil, épée and sabre. Its members are students, alumni and staff from Trinity College with a small amount of visiting fencers from other clubs.

Early history
In 1730, a group of students from Trinity College formed a Gentleman's Club of the Sword, or the Gentleman's Society of the Sword as it has also been called. This club, while initially hugely popular fell out of use by the last quarter of the 18th century. In 1774, Provost John Hely-Hutchinson formally established fencing in Trinity by employing a fencing-master and designating the Senate House specifically for this purpose. With the further decline of duelling throughout the 18th and no record of the club throughout the 19th century, it is not until the formation of the modern D.U. Fencing Club in 1936 that the sport was reestablished in the college.

Present status

Since its foundation, DUFC has grown vastly. In the late 1960s and early 1970s, membership was about fifty fencers in general with an Intervarsities team of 8. In contrast, the 2009/2010 season saw intake of approximately 300 new members with an Intervarsities contingent of 24 competing, with similar numbers maintained in the club since.

The club's most decorated coach, Professor Patrick Duffy, coached the club from 1952 until 1987. Following his death in 1987, The Professor Duffy Memorial Team Épée tournament was inaugurated by D.U.Fencing Club. This competition is still run today and attracts teams from Germany, Italy and the U.K. regularly.

The club has maintained its status as a centre of excellence, consistently ranking at the top of the national club medal table in Ireland. During the 2017/18 season, Dublin University Fencing Club became part of the Trinity Sport high performance programme, giving its first team access to additional strength and conditioning coaching, physiotherapy, anti-doping and nutritional expertise.

Notable alumni
Since the formation of the modern club, a number of members have gone on to represent the club and their country in both fencing and the modern pentathlon. Some of these members are listed below.

 Patrick Duffy, competed at the 1948 and 1952 Summer Olympics
 Harry Thuillier, competed in foil at the 1952 and 1960 Summer Olympics
 Shirley Armstrong, competed in the women's individual foil event at the 1960 Summer Olympics
 Brian Hamilton, competed in the individual foil and team épée events at the 1960 Summer Olympics
Colm Murrogh Vere O'Brien, competed at the 1968 Summer Olympics
Natalya Coyle, competed at the 2012 and 2016 Summer Olympics in the modern pentathlon

Competitions

Hosted competitions
D.U.Fencing Club hosts a number of competitions on an annual basis. Events currently hosted are listed below:

 The Professor Duffy Memorial Team Épée
 Trinity Cup
 Trinity Team Foil
 Dublin Épée

The Colours Match
Known colloquially as Colours, The Colours Match (the fencing equivalent of its rugby counterpart) is hosted yearly between Dublin University and University College Dublin with each club cycling hosting privileges yearly.

Honours

Pinks
Pinks are awarded for outstanding service to a sports club, usually with regard to representative honours, by the Central Athletic Club (D.U.C.A.C.). Athletes in D.U.Fencing Club who have received pinks are listed below followed by the year of the award.

References

External links 

 Official Website
 Official Twitter

Fencing